Titaenini is a tribe of darkling beetles in the family Tenebrionidae. There are at least eight genera recognised in the tribe Titaenini, all found in Australasia.

Genera
These genera belong to the tribe Titaenini:
 Artystona Bates, 1874
 Callismilax Bates, 1874
 Cerodolus Sharp, 1886
 Demtrius Broun, 1895
 Leaus Matthews & Lawrence, 1992 
 Partystona Watt, 1992
 Pseudhelops Guérin-Méneville, 1841
 Titaena Erichson, 1842

References

Further reading

 
 

Tenebrionoidea
Tenebrionidae genera